The green neon tetra (Paracheirodon simulans) is a freshwater fish of the family Characidae of order Characiformes. It is native to the upper Orinoco and Negro Rivers in South America.

This fish is similar in appearance to the closely related and better-known neon tetra, but it is slightly smaller, and its red patch is less pronounced, while the blue-green areas of the upper body are more brilliant. Also, its body is slimmer than that of the neon tetra.

Like the other Paracheirodon species, the green neon tetra is kept as an aquarium fish, but it is less commonly seen than either the neon tetra or the cardinal tetra.

P. simulans is also sometimes called the blue or false neon. Hyphessobrycon simulans and Cheirodon simulans are obsolete synonyms.

This fish loses its brilliant blue and red colors when lights are switched off, but regains them when lights are switched on again.

Breeding

Ideally, the water should be highly stained by the tannins from peat, in subdued light, shaded by plants. It spawns in a school, although in the actual act of spawning, one female may be closely associated with one or more males.

About 130 eggs can be laid by each female. The parents should be removed after spawning. The eggs should hatch in 24 hours. The eggs are light sensitive so avoid light. The babies are very small, so feeding infusoria (protozoa) is necessary early on. As they grow, this can increasingly be supplemented with fine commercial fry foods. Adults can breed again after a few weeks.

See also
List of freshwater aquarium fish species

References

simulans
Tetras
Fishkeeping
Freshwater fish of South America
Freshwater fish of Brazil
Freshwater fish of Colombia
Fish described in 1963
Taxa named by Jacques Géry